J. R. Boone (July 29, 1925 – January 21, 2012) was an American football player and coach.  He played professionally as an end and halfback for six seasons in the National Football League (NFL) with the Chicago Bears,  San Francisco 49ers, and Green Bay Packers. Boone was drafted by the Chicago Bears in the 22nd round of the 1948 NFL Draft. He served as the head football coach at California State University, Fresno from 1973 to 1975, compiling a record of 10–24.

Born in Clinton, Oklahoma, was a star athlete at the University of Tulsa, earned nine letters and graduating with a degree in physical education and social science.  A captain of the Tulsa football team, Boone was also a star athlete in basketball, track, baseball. He was a versatile athlete, he played football as a back, safety, and punt and kick returner. He was also drafted by the New York Yankees baseball organization.

Boone was traded to the San Francisco 49ers in 1952, and then to the Green Bay Packers in 1953.  His six-year pro career statistics included 497 rushing yards in 130 carries and five touchdowns in 63 games. He also caught 69 passes for 1,251 yards and eight touchdowns, averaging 18.1 yards per catch), and returned seventy-two punt returns for 725 yards (10.1 average).

In 1972, Boone was inducted into the Fresno County Athletic Hall of Fame. He died in his sleep on January 21, 2012, at his home in Selma, California.

Head coaching record

College

References

1925 births
2012 deaths
American football ends
American football halfbacks
Fresno State Bulldogs football coaches
Chicago Bears players
Green Bay Packers players
San Francisco 49ers players
Tulsa Golden Hurricane football players
High school football coaches in California
Junior college football coaches in the United States
People from Clinton, Oklahoma
People from Selma, California
Players of American football from Oklahoma